Rock the Nation may refer to:

 "Rock the Nation", song from The Blitz
 "Rock the Nation", 1973, song from Montrose (album)
 Rock the Nations, 1986 album from Saxon
 Rock the Nation Tour, 2004 tour by Kiss
 Rock the Nation Live! (DVD), DVD release of the tour